Song County or Songxian is a county under the administration of the prefecture-level city of Luoyang, in the west of Henan Province, China. It contains the southernmost point of Luoyang's administrative area.

Administrative divisions
As 2012, this county is divided to 9 towns and 7 townships.
Towns

Townships

Climate

References

External links
Official website of Song County Government

County-level divisions of Henan
Luoyang